"Senza riserva" is a song by Italian singer Annalisa. It was written by Roberto Casalino and produced by Dado Parisini.

It was released by Warner Music Italy on 16 March 2012 as the lead single of her second studio album Mentre tutto cambia. The song peaked at number 8 on the FIMI Singles Chart and was certified platinum in Italy.

Music video
A music video to accompany the release of "Senza riserva" was released onto YouTube on 21 March 2012. It was directed by Gaetano Morbioli and shot in Verona. The video won the Best Italian Videoclip Award.

Track listing

Charts

Weekly charts

Year-end charts

Certifications

References

2012 singles
2012 songs
Annalisa songs
Songs written by Roberto Casalino